Marudi Airport  is an airport in Marudi, Miri Division, Sarawak, Malaysia.
It has a 10/28 runway and its aircraft parking bay can handle three to four de Havilland Canada DHC-6 Twin Otter at the same time.

Airlines and destinations

Incidents
 7 November 2012 — a de Havilland Canada DHC-6 Twin Otter (9M-MDO), operating as MASwings Flight 3592 from Miri to Marudi, veered left off the runway during its landing and ended up in a ditch. All 17 people on board survived.
 27 August 2016 — a de Havilland Canada DHC-6-400 Twin Otter (9M-SSB), operating as MASwings Flight 3568 from Miri to Marudi, skidded left off the runway during its landing. All four passengers and two crew members on board survived. No casualties were reported.

References

External links

Short Take-Off and Landing Airports (STOL) at Malaysia Airports Holdings Berhad

Airports in Sarawak